The Cannondale Bicycle Corporation is an American division of Dutch conglomerate Pon Holdings that supplies bicycles. Its headquarters are in Wilton, Connecticut, with engineering offices in Freiburg, Germany. Frames are manufactured in Taiwan.

History
The company was founded in 1971 by Joe Montgomery and Murdock MacGregor to manufacture precast concrete housing.  Later Ron Davis came to Cannondale from CBS Laboratories where he was vice-president in charge of the development of microfilm reproduction.  Davis had an idea for an internal combustion engine that would use ammonia as fuel. Davis, with MacGregor as his assistant, managed to duplicate and exceed results obtained by Allison Engine, then a division of General Motors. Faced with a commitment to invest a large amount of capital to take the project to a workable model installed in an automobile, Montgomery decided that the company should raise capital by developing and marketing other products that they had conceived.  By now MacGregor and Davis had recruited two more CBS Laboratory alumni: John Wistrand, an industrial designer, and Jim Catrambone, in management. An air conditioner with no moving parts was a first effort.

Then Joe Montgomery, after a camping bike trip with his son, conceived "the Bugger" bicycle trailer.  Ron Davis devised an under-seat hitch, a torsion spring made of Lexan. Wistrand designed the cloth bags and cargo carrier on the two models of trailers. Montgomery, in an effort repeated in numerous products, sourced the cloth components and oversaw their manufacture. At the New York Bicycle Show the team received requests from bike dealers who wanted to buy the bags. In less than six months Cannondale became the world's largest manufacturer of lightweight bicycle bags.  Using a marketing plan devised by Montgomery, Cannondale secured orders from more than 2,500 dealers in less than 20 months. They then used the infrastructure developed to produce the bags to enter the camping goods market with backpacks and tents. Regarding the Bugger trailer, although Cannondale's marketing department claimed to be unaware of the connotations of that name in British English, some were, nevertheless, exported to the UK.

Todd Patterson, another designer/inventor, joined the company and developed the process for jigging and welding aluminum bicycle frames, enabling Cannondale to become a bicycle manufacturer.

Today, Cannondale produces high-end bicycles, although they are no longer hand-made in the US. Many bicycle frame manufacturers use many materials such as steel or titanium whereas Cannondale specializes in aluminum and carbon fiber, a technology in which they were pioneers.

The name of the company was taken from the Cannondale Metro North train station in Wilton, Connecticut. Another story as told in their 1983 catalog is that employee Pete Meyers was sent to order telephone service installation in 1970. When asked for the name of the business to be listed under, Meyers coined the name while looking at a rusty cannon inscribed "dale" and the sign on the Cannon railroad crossing.

Ownership
Originally a privately held company, Cannondale became publicly held after a $22 million IPO in 1995.

In the late 1990s Cannondale moved into the motorsports business, producing a line of off-road motorcycles and all-terrain vehicles. According to an interview with Cannondale Communications Director, Tom Armstrong, the company was unable to reduce the cost of their vehicles fast enough. As sales increased, the company was losing money on each motorbike. This gap drove the company into bankruptcy protection on January 29, 2003. Cannondale's full assets were then purchased at auction by Pegasus Capital Advisors fund Pegasus Partners II, L.P. Pegasus sold off the motorsport division and supported the company's renewed focus on bicycle production.

In February 2008, Dorel Industries, a Canada-based diversified consumer products company, announced the purchase of Cannondale from Pegasus Capital for approximately $200 million. Dorel also owned Pacific Cycle, a distributor of bicycles made in Taiwan and the People's Republic of China for sale under many historic U.S. cycle brands, including Schwinn, Mongoose, Roadmaster, and GT.

In April 2009 it was announced that all production would be transferred to Taiwan.

In January 2022, Pon Holdings, a Dutch mobility group, purchased Dorel Sports. https://www.bike-eu.com/market/nieuws/2022/01/dorel-sports-officially-in-hands-of-pon-holdings-10142026.

Products

Bicycle frames
On January 23, 2014, Dorel Industries announced a restructuring of operations in its recreational/leisure segment. This resulted in the closure of its assembly and testing facility in Bedford, Pennsylvania. The Bedford plant, which at one point produced Cannondale's midrange to high-end aluminum and aluminum/carbon fiber bikes, still handled some assembly, testing, quality control, and customer and technical services. Around 100 people were laid off. The Bedford facility was shuttered in 2015.

CAAD design and manufacturing

In 1992 Cannondale introduced the 2.8 series frame based on CAD (computer aided design) and finite element analysis to make a frame weighing only 2.8 lbs. The 2.8 series featured a tapered large diameter down tube, double-offset bottom-bracket cluster, ovalized top-tube, and double-butted seat tube to achieve the weight reduction. The same year the 1.25" Sub One all aluminum fork was introduced.

Cannondale marketed subsequent frames with the CAAD designation (for "Cannondale Advanced Aluminum Design") which first appeared in their mountain bike frame series. In 1997 the CAAD3 road frame was introduced featuring most of the design from the 2.8series.  The CAAD4 model introduced S-bend aluminum seat stays for improved comfort.

The Six13 model, which was introduced in 2004, used carbon tube sections in the main triangle, and still employs aluminum rear triangles.  This arrangement is contrary to the usual industry practice of using carbon stay inserts and aluminum front triangle tubes. The Union Cycliste Internationale has established a 6.8 kg (14.97 lb) minimum weight limit.  Cannondale advertised this light weight frameset with the slogan "Legalize my Cannondale".  In reality, only the smallest size (50 cm) of bike actually approached the 6.8 kg limit.  Some in the bicycle industry considered this to be a creative marketing effort because Six13 frames weighed the same as, or more than, competing frames from other manufacturers.

Electric bicycles

An electric bicycle manufactured by Cannondale Sports Group LLC includes a battery module based on Toshiba's quick-charging lithium ion titanite rechargeable battery "SCiB".

Other components
Cannondale developed a proprietary bottom bracket and crankset technology called Hollowgram which has been featured in its high-end bikes since 2001. The crank and bottom bracket set weigh 80 grams less and are 10% stiffer than Dura-Ace (FC-7800).  The hollowgram bottom bracket shell can accept standard 68 mm English-threaded bottom bracket cartridges and external bearing cranksets through the use of an adapter. The aluminum Hollowgram crank is a two piece hollow shell that is bonded with aluminum glue. The Hollowgram bottom bracket axle is also hollow aluminum and oversized.

Cannondale has since made this a free international standard known as BB30. In BB30, the diameter of the bottom bracket spindle is increased from the standard 24mm to 30mm. As a result, the inside diameter of the bottom bracket shell is increased to 42mm. This allows a reduction in weight by permitting aluminum to be used as a spindle material instead of the more traditional steel. The larger spindle in addition to the larger bottom bracket shell make for increased stiffness of both the frame and crankset. Perhaps the biggest difference between the BB30 standard and more traditional bottom brackets is the use of pressed-in bearings rather than cartridge or cup bearings. The lack of threads or extra "packaging" creates additional weight savings. Because of the "press fit" needed to hold the bearings, tighter and more precise machining tolerances are needed. A disadvantage of BB30 is the harder-to-service nature presented by pressed-in bearings.

Cannondale has brought a few concepts to market that have since become accepted industry standards. Cannondale was the first to produce a crankset that uses externally mounted bottom bracket bearings, though they later discontinued this design. External bearings are now the most common type of bottom bracket for mid-level and higher bicycles. In 1992, Cannondale introduced the Headshok and the accompanying oversized headtube.
In 2001, the OnePointFive standard emerged using similar headtube dimensions as the Headshok headtube.

Less successfully, Cannondale mountain bikes (and briefly, the 2.8 road bike with a SubOne fork) produced in the mid-1990s used the Gary Fisher "Evolution", or 1" headset standard, in common with Fisher's own bikes and Santana tandems.  Although a larger headset seemed technically sound, the industry standardized instead upon the Tioga "Avenger", or 1" size, and headsets or stems for these bikes are now hard to find.  A solution for cherished machines is to fit reducing rings and convert to a 1" headset, fork and stem.

Notable Cannondale mountain bikes

SM-500 (1984) 
The 1984 SM-500 All-Terrain Bicycle was Cannondale's first mountain bike. The front wheel was 26 inches in diameter whereas the rear wheel was only 24 inches large "to increase traction for climbing in steep, muddy terrain", Cannondale said. The frame was TIG welded from 6061 aluminium alloy and was fully heat treated. The same material and treatment Cannondale would use for all welded aluminum frames until the release of frames made from Alcoa Alcalyte Optimo alloy in 2003. The fork was made from chrome moly steel. The componentry on the SM-500 was a mixture of parts from Shimano Deore XT, Suntour, Specialized and Dia-Compe. The bike had a 3x5 drive train offering 15 gears, and cantilever brakes in the front and U-brakes in back. The bike retailed for $595 (approximately equivalent to $1640 in 2021–USD) in the United States.

Beast of the East

SE (1991) 
The SE was Cannondale's first frame with rear suspension, called Elevated Suspension Technology (E.S.T), a rear triangle with a high pivot and elevated chain stays. SE models were sold with rigid Cannondale Pepperoni aluminum forks and Girvin Flexstem stems. The bikes shipped with Cannondale's Force 40 system to increase the braking power.

SM 3.0

Delta V (1992) 
The Delta V was the first bike to introduce Cannondale's Delta V (later Headshok) suspension fork where the shock is integrated into the head tube. The Delta V was sold as a full-suspension bike with the E.S.T rear triangle, or as a "front suspension only" bike with a normal rigid frame (the term "hardtail" had not been invented). The original Delta V fork offered approximately 45–50 mm of travel and used an oil-damped air spring. The telescope of the Delta V fork had a square cross-section and instead of bushings, needle bearings were used to minimize stiction. Delta V forks were stiffer and more responsive than other suspension forks at the time.

Since the Delta V fork was taller than normal forks, the top end of head tube of Delta V frames was significantly higher. To not sacrifice stand-over clearance, Cannondale made a "V-style" top tube from two tubes – a very controversial design. Like other Cannondale mountain bike frames, the Delta V frame had a 50.8 mm (2 inches) down tube.

The full-suspension version was discontinued in 1994 in favor of the Super V. In 1994, the hardtail's rear triangle was updated and was identical to the rear in the F series frames. The Delta V hardtail was finally retired in 1995 and replaced by the F series. The two-tube top tube design remained in use for the smallest frame size and reappeared in the Gemini and 'Prophet models.

 Super V (1993) 
The Super V, a full-suspension bike, is arguably Cannondale's most iconic mountain bike. Instead of a main triangle, Cannondale uses a massively oversized down tube and a mast to hold the seat. The rear wheel is suspended by a banana-shaped aluminum high-pivot swingarm providing about 75 mm of travel. The front wheel is guided by a Delta V fork. The Super V is one of the most futuristic looking bikes of its time.

Missy Giove won the 1994 downhill world championship on a Super V.

In 1995, the welded aluminum banana swingarm was replaced by a carbon-fiber version. This was Cannondale's first carbon-fiber product.

In 1996, Cannondale changed the swingarm and lowered the pivot for the "Super V Active" to minimize pedal kickback present high-pivot swingarm designs. Different versions of the Super V Active frame and swingarm were made with travels of 80, 100, or 120 mm. Some models in 2000 and 2001 shipped with a new, bonded aluminum swingarm that was less expensive.

The Super V was discontinued in 2003.

 V 4000 (1993) 
The V 4000 was a non-functional full-suspension concept bike that never went into production, yet it caught attention due its futuristic design.  The frame and the wheels where machined from aluminum. The highlight of the design was the suspension, two single-sided swingarms. Cannondale's president at the time, Joe Montgomery, said he would eat his hat if the V 4000 wouldn't be in the shops in the next season. Although Cannondale promised additional information later in the year, it was never revealed how the suspension was planned to work. The V 4000 was widely considered a show bike for magazines and trade shows, and Montgomery eventually ate his hat. The V 4000 was the first in a row of concept bikes Cannondale presented.

 Killer V (1994) 
The Killer V was a version of the Delta V without a suspension fork but with a 1.25" rigid Pepperoni fork. The down tube diameter was increased from 50.8 mm to 58 mm which made the bike very stiff.

 F (1995) 
The F was the front suspension bike line with Cannondale's suspension forks, called "Headshok" since 1994. In contrast to the Delta V frame, the F series had a straight top tube. The frame was available with either a swagged ("2.8 series", later "CAAD 3") or a straight ("3.0 series", later "CAAD 2") down tube. The rear triangle features wishbone seat stays.

Alison Sydor won 3 cross-country world-championships (1994–1996), and a silver medal at the 1996 Olympic Games on this bike.

 Super V DH (1996) 

 Super V Raven (1997) 
The Raven  was a version of the Super V with a carbon-aluminum frame. It was the first bicycle frame by Cannondale made with carbon-fiber. Instead of an aluminum weldment, the main frame of the Raven was made of a cast and machined aluminum spine bonded between two carbon-fiber shells. The rear triangle was identical to the aluminum Super V's. The frame was updated in 2000. After a recall in 2001 of all Raven II frames due to failures of the pivot and bottom bracket area, the Raven was discontinued in 2002. The Raven frame was hollow and a large sound box.

 Super V DHF / Fulcrum (1997) 

 Jekyll (2001) 
The Jekyll was a full-suspension bike using the same swingarm as the contemporary Super V but with a traditional down tube and top tube design. The rear shock mount in the frame was adjustable such that the head tube and seat tube angles could be changed by the rider. Initially, the Jekyll came with 120 mm rear travel, and 135 mm from 2003 on. The front suspension was typically a Cannondale Headshok Fatty or a Cannondale Lefty. The Jekyll was discontinued in 2006.

 Scalpel (2002) 
The Scalpel was a light-weight full-suspension bike designed for cross-country racing with flexible carbon-fiber chain stays instead of a pivot, providing 63 mm of rear travel and 67 mm from model year 2003 on.
In 2008, Cannondale introduced an all-carbon Scalpel, and moved the rear shock to enable 100 mm travel. The 26-inch version was discontinued in 2013 when Cannondale finished to 29-inch wheels for cross-country bikes.

 Gemini (2003) 

 Chase (2005) 
The Chase was a dirt-jump bike developed with Cannondale sponsored rider Aaron Chase. The Chase was discontinued in 2010 and it remained the first and only dirt-jump bike made by Cannondale until the introduction of the Dave'' in 2021.

Prophet (2005)

Rush (2006)

Judge (2007)

Perp (2007)

Taurine (2007)

Caffeine (2007)

Moto (2009)

Rize (2009)

Flash (2010)

Jekyll (2011)

Claymore (2011)

Trigger 29 (2013)

Sponsorships

Road racing

Saeco, 1996–2004 
Cannondale's sponsorship of Division 1 road racing teams began with the  team in the late 1990s, highlighted by Mario Cipollini's four consecutive stage wins in the 1999 Tour de France. The team notably won the Giro d'Italia five times, in 1997 with Ivan Gotti, in 2003 with Gilberto Simoni in 2004 with Damiano Cunego. Saeco became Lampre–Caffita in 2005, and the relationship with Cannondale was severed.

Barloworld, 2006–2007 
Cannondale was the bicycle sponsor of UCI Professional Continental team Barloworld.

Liquigas, 2007–2012 
In 2011, they became a title sponsor under the name Liquigas–Cannondale.

Bahati Foundation Pro Cycling Team, 2010 
Cannondale was the bicycle sponsor UCI Continental team Bahati Foundation in 2010.

Cannondale Pro Cycling, 2013–2014 
In 2013, Cannondale took over the title sponsorship of the Liquigas team.

Team Cannondale−Garmin, 2015

Cannondale Pro Cycling Team, 2016

Cannondale–Drapac Pro Cycling Team, 2017–2017

Team EF Education First–Drapac p/b Cannondale, 2018

EF Education First Pro Cycling, 2019

EF Pro Cycling, 2020

EF Education–Nippo, 2021

Tibco-Silicon Valley Bank, 2020–2021 
In 2020, Cannondale became the bike sponsor of the Tibco–Silicon Valley Bank UCI Women's World Tour team.

Mountain biking

Volvo Cannondale Mountain Bike Racing Team, 1994–2002 
The Volvo Cannondale Mountain Bike Racing Team was one of the most successful elite professional racing teams in the history of mountain biking. Over the 9 season, Volvo Cannondale racers won 11 gold medals, 3 silver medals and 2 bronze medals at world championships, as well as one silver and once bronze medal at Olympic Games, and one bronze medal at European championships.

Cross-country riders: Alison Sydor (1994–1999), Tinker Juarez (1994–2002), Sara Ellis (1994–1996), Marc Gullickson (1994–1995), Cyrille Bonnand (1996–1997), Annabella Stropparo (1996–2000), Cadel Evans (1998–2001), Christoph Sauser (1999–2002)

Downhill riders: Franck Roman (1994–1996), Missy Giove (1994–1998), Myles Rockwell (1994–1998), Kenichi Nabeshima (1995–1997), Kim Sonier (1996–1998), Oscar Saiz (1997–1998), Brigitta Kasper (1998), David Vasquez-Lopez (1998), Anne-Caroline Chausson (1999–2002), Cédric Gracia (1999–2002), Brian Lopes (1999–2000)

Trial athletes: Libor Karas (1994–?), Martyn Ashton (1997), Lance Trappe

SoBe Cannondale 1998–2003 
The SoBe Cannondale team was an amateur and professional racing team in the USA.

Siemens mobile Cannondale, 2003–2005 
Siemens mobile and Cannondale contracted the austrian racing team Rainer-Wurz.com, co-owned by formula one racer Alexander Wurz to form the successor of the Volvo Cannondale team.

Cross-country riders: Christoph Sauser (2003–2005), Roel Paulissen (2003–2004), Hannes Pallhuber (2003), Franz Hofer (2003) Tinker Juarez (2003)

Downhill, 4-Cross: Cédric Gracia (2003), Petra Bernhard (2003)

Cannondale Vredestein, 2006–2008 
Kashi Leuchs (XC, 2006–2008), Fredrik Kessiakoff (XC, 2006–2007), Peter Riis Andersen (XC, 2006), Jakob Fuglsang (XC, 2006–2008), Roel Paulissen (XC, 2007–2008), Jelmer Jubbega (XC 2007).

Bear Naked Cannondale 2007 
The Bear Naked Cannondale team was the successor of the SoBe Cannondale team.

Cannondale Factory Racing, since 2009 
Roel Paulissen (XC, 2009–2010), Marco Fontana (XC, 2009–2017), Martin Gujan (XC, 2009–2012), Manuel Fumic (XC, 2010-today)

MonaVie Cannondale 
Tinker Juarez

Individual sponsorships 
Aaron Chase (1997–2014), Jerome Clementz (enduro, 2009–2020), Chris Van Dine (DH, 2006–?), Albertus Jooste (2019)

Triathlon 
In triathlon racing, Cannondale has sponsored 2005 Ironman world champion Faris Al-Sultan, Dejan Patrčević, Croatian triathlon champion, as well as three time Ironman world champion Chrissie Wellington, Sarah Reinertsen, the first amputee woman to finish the Ironman Triathlon, 2004 Paralympics 200 IM gold medalist Rudy Garcia-Tolson.

See also
 Klein Bikes

References

External links
 
 Vintage Cannondale

Cycle manufacturers of the United States
Mountain bike manufacturers
EF Education–EasyPost
Companies based in Fairfield County, Connecticut
American companies established in 1971
Vehicle manufacturing companies established in 1971
1971 establishments in Connecticut
Wilton, Connecticut
1995 initial public offerings
2008 mergers and acquisitions
American subsidiaries of foreign companies